Devonport Cricket Club commonly known as Devonport Orions, or simply Devonport, is an Australian amateur cricket club based in Devonport, Tasmania. Devonport Cricket Club represents the third largest city in the state of Tasmania by population. The club has many teams which represent it, some of which include: First grade men, second grade men, under 16 boys, under 12’s, First grade women, under 17 girls, second grade women and many more.

Honours
CNW Premierships: 13; 1956/57, 1966/67, 1967/68, 1975/76, 1979/80, 1980/81, 1984/85, 1985/86, 1993/94, 1997/98, 2000/01, 2003/04, 2014/15

See also

Cricket Tasmania
Tasmanian Grade Cricket

References

External links

Tasmanian grade cricket clubs
Sport in Devonport, Tasmania